The Battle of Chalons may be:

 Battle of Châlons (274), a battle between the Roman and Gallic empires
 Battle of the Catalaunian Plains (451), part of the Hunnic invasion of the Roman province of Gaul